The 1931 Primera División season was the 40th season of top-flight football in Argentina and the first to be professional in the country, after eighteen clubs broke away from the amateur league structure to form the professional league, "Liga Argentina de Football" (LAF). The inaugural champions was Boca Juniors led by coach Mario Fortunato. The top scorer of the championship was Alberto Zozaya of Estudiantes de La Plata with 33 goals.

The official body (AFA) remained amateur under the denomination "Asociación Amateurs Argentina de Football".

Final tables

Asociación Argentina de Football (AFA) 
The championship had originally started on May 10, 1931 with 34 teams competing. After the first run was played, 19 teams disjoined the league to move to recently created Liga Argentina de Football (professional); they were Argentinos Juniors, Atlanta, Boca Juniors, Chacarita Juniors, Defensores de Belgrano, Estudiantes LP, Ferro Carril Oeste, Gimnasia y Esgrima LP, Huracán, Independiente, Lanús, Platense, Quilmes, Racing, River Plate, San Lorenzo, Talleres (RE), Tigre, and Vélez Sarsfield.

Championship playoff 
Estudiantil Porteño and Almagro finished level on points at the top of the table, so a championship playoff was played to proclaim a champion.

Final

Liga Argentina de Football

Top goalscorers

References

Argentine Primera División seasons
Argentine Primera Division
Primera Division